Data is a genus of moths of the family Noctuidae.

Species
 Data aroa (Bethune-Baker, 1906)
 Data callopistrioides (Moore, 1881)
 Data clava (Leech, 1900)
 Data dissimilis Warren, 1911
 Data eriopoides Prout, 1928
 Data manta (Swinhoe, 1902)
 Data obliterata Warren, 1911
 Data ochroneura (Turner, 1943)
 Data pratti (Bethune-Baker, 1906)
 Data rectisecta Warren, 1912
 Data rhabdochlaena Wileman & West, 1929
 Data thalpophiloides Walker, 1862
 Data variegata (Swinhoe, 1895)

References

Natural History Museum Lepidoptera genus database
Data at funet

Hadeninae
Moth genera